Canal Bank Road (Punjabi, Sarak-e-Nehr) also known as Khayaban-e-Annemarie Schimmel, is a major eight-lane east–west signal-free road which extends along the banks of the Lahore Canal in Lahore, Punjab, Pakistan. The road serves as a major central artery of Lahore and extends from Multan Road in Thokar Niaz Beg to BRB Canal Road in Khaira, passing through the neighbourhoods of Johar, Gulberg, Mughalpura and Harbanspura.

Name change 
Originally known as Canal Bank Road, in 2000, the Government of Pakistan renamed Canal Bank Road in honour of Annemarie Schimmel, for her works in Sufism and Muhammad Iqbal, a prominent philosopher and national poet of Pakistan.

Interchanges & exits 

There are 12 underpasses along the entire route of Canal Bank Road, which allows continuous flow of traffic from Thokar Niaz Beg to Harbanspura. The Thokar Niaz Baig Flyover allows motorists from Multan Road and the M-2 motorway to bypass Thokar Niaz Beg Chowk, which previously was a major choke point.

Extension & reconstruction 
Canal Bank Road has continuously needed widening and repaving due to its heavy use.

 Multan Road – Abdul Haque Road: Construction to widen this section began on 28 October 2011 and was completed on 15 January 2012 at cost of 

See also 
 List of streets in Lahore
 Transport in Lahore
 List of bus routes in Lahore

References 

Streets in Lahore
Roads in Lahore